Farmington is a city in Fulton County & Peoria County, Illinois, United States. It is north of Canton, west of Peoria, southeast of Galesburg, and northeast of Macomb. The population was 2,448 at the 2010 census, down from 2,601 at the 2000 census. The public school system is Farmington Central Community Unit School District 265, which includes Farmington Central High School. Because it is in Fulton County, it is a part of the Canton Micropolitan Area and the wider Peoria Consolidated Statistical Area.

History
Farmington was founded circa 1827. The area was first inhabited by members of the Potawatomi tribe. The city is named after Farmington, Connecticut.

Before and during the Civil War, the city was involved in the Underground Railroad, and there are several remaining homes that were safehouses. In the early 1900s, many Italian immigrants settled in Farmington.

Geography
Farmington is located in the northeast corner of Fulton County at  (40.698855, -90.003673).  Illinois Routes 78 and 116 pass through the center of the city. IL 116 enters from the north as North Main Street, and IL 78 enters from the south as South Main Street. The two highways leave the city to the east on East Fort Street. IL 78 leads north  to Kewanee and south  to Canton, the largest city in Fulton County, while IL 116 leads east  to Peoria and west 22 miles to St. Augustine.

Demographics

As of the census of 2000, there were 2,601 people, 1,035 households, and 710 families residing in the city. The racial makeup of the city was 98.62% White, 0.12% African American, 0.35% Native American, 0.15% Asian, 0.19% from other races, and 0.58% from two or more races. Hispanic or Latino of any race were 0.96% of the population.

There were 1,035 households, out of which 29.7% had children under the age of 18 living with them, 57.2% were married couples living together, 7.9% had a female householder with no husband present, and 31.4% were non-families. 29.2% of all households were made up of individuals, and 16.4% had someone living alone who was 65 years of age or older.  The average household size was 2.43 and the average family size was 2.97.

In the city the population was spread out, with 23.0% under the age of 18, 8.5% from 18 to 24, 26.1% from 25 to 44, 20.5% from 45 to 64, and 21.8% who were 65 years of age or older.  The median age was 40 years. For every 100 females, there were 88.6 males.  For every 100 females age 18 and over, there were 86.6 males.

The median income for a household in the city was $35,893, and the median income for a family was $49,167. Males had a median income of $34,500 versus $25,590 for females. The per capita income for the city was $19,336.  About 4.2% of families and 7.0% of the population were below the poverty line, including 6.3% of those under age 18 and 6.4% of those age 65 or over.

Notable people
 Lewis Russell, actor born in Farmington
 Bill Tuttle, outfielder for the Detroit Tigers, Kansas City Athletics, and the Minnesota Twins; built a house on S. Apple Street in Farmington
 Fred Venturelli, placekicker for the Chicago Bears, born in Farmington

References

Cities in Fulton County, Illinois
Populated places on the Underground Railroad
Cities in Illinois
1827 establishments in Illinois